"We Got the World" is a song recorded by Swedish DJ and electropop duo Icona Pop, from their debut studio album Icona Pop (2012). It was written by Aino Jawo, Caroline Hjelt, Linus Eklöw, Nicole Morier, Tove Nilsson, and its producer Elof Loelv. It was released for digital download and streaming on 15 October 2012 through TEN Music Group as the album's third single. Later the song was included on the duo's second studio album and debut international album This Is... Icona Pop (2013). The song entered the Swedish Singles Chart at number 54 and eventually peaked at number 29.

This song served as the theme song for the MTV talk show Nikki & Sara Live as well as for the 2013 CONCACAF U-20 Championship in Mexico. It is also used in a promotion video for season 13 of the Canadian teen drama show, Degrassi. In 2015, The Barden Bellas covered this song as part of the Kennedy Center Performance in the musical comedy film Pitch Perfect 2.

Track listing

Credits and personnel
Credits adapted from Genius.
 Icona Pop – composition, vocals
 Elof Loelv – composition, production, programming
 Linus Eklöw – composition
 Jimmy Koitzsh – composition (uncredited)
 Nicole Morier – composition
 Tove Nilsson – composition
 Chris Gehringer – mastering
 Robert Orton – mixing

Charts

Release history

Eric Saade version 

In 2017, Swedish singer Eric Saade recorded the cover and rearranged version of "We Got the World" as a part of the eighth season of the Swedish reality television show, Så mycket bättre. The version was released on 3 December 2017 through Roxy Recordings. Later, the version was on their extended play, Så mycket bättre 2017 – Tolkningarna (2017), which compiles all the songs the singer performed on the show.

Track listings

Release history

References

2012 singles
Icona Pop songs
2013 CONCACAF U-20 Championship
Songs written by Elof Loelv
Songs written by Tove Lo
Songs written by Nicole Morier
Songs written by Aino Jawo
2012 songs
Songs written by Caroline Hjelt
Songs written by Style of Eye
Song recordings produced by Elof Loelv